National may refer to:

Common uses
 Nation or country
 Nationality – a national is a person who is subject to a nation, regardless of whether the person has full rights as a citizen

Places in the United States
 National, Maryland, census-designated place
 National, Nevada, ghost town
 National, Utah, ghost town
 National, West Virginia, unincorporated community

Commerce
 National (brand), a brand name of electronic goods from Panasonic
 National Benzole (or simply known as National), former petrol station chain in the UK, merged with BP
 National Car Rental, an American rental car company
 National Energy Systems, a former name of Eco Marine Power
 National Entertainment Commission, a former name of the Media Rating Council
 National Motor Vehicle Company, Indianapolis, Indiana, USA 1900-1924
 National Supermarkets, a defunct American grocery store chain
  National String Instrument Corporation, a guitar company formed to manufacture the first resonator guitars
 Their successor companies:
 National Dobro Corporation
 National Reso-Phonic Guitars
 In the context of stringed instruments, the tricone and biscuit designs promoted by the National String Instrument Corporation
 National International, a Nationwide Mutual Insurance Company-like Company

Sports
 Championnat National (also known as National), French football league competition
 National (curling), annual curling bonspiel
 SK Nationalkameratene, Norwegian sports club
 TIL National, Norwegian sports club

Other uses
 National (Cymanfa Ganu), a Welsh festival in Wales, England and North America

See also
 
 
 Le National (disambiguation), various newspapers and a television program
 Nacional (disambiguation)
 National Party (disambiguation)
 Nationals (disambiguation)
 The National (disambiguation)
 International (disambiguation)
 Transnational (disambiguation)
 Supranational (disambiguation)
 Subnational (disambiguation)
 Nationality (disambiguation)
 Nation (disambiguation)